Springhouse Airpark  is located near Springhouse, British Columbia, Canada.

References

Registered aerodromes in British Columbia
Cariboo Regional District